Frank Lennox Douglas (born April 30, 1943) is a Guyanese-American biomedical researcher and business executive.

Education and career
Douglas was born April 30, 1943 in Georgetown, Guyana.  He graduated with a BS in Engineering from Lehigh University in 1966. He went on to a PhD in Physical Chemistry from Cornell University, which he received at the beginning of 1973, with a thesis on chlorophyll-a.  After a brief stint working at Xerox, Douglas moved to New York City to pursue a medical degree from the Cornell University Medical School. After finishing the MD, Douglas completed an internship and residency in internal medicine at Johns Hopkins Medical Institution, and a fellowship in neuroendocrinology at the National Institutes of Health.

Following his fellowship, Douglas took a position as an assistant professor of medicine at the University of Chicago, in which role he remained for 5 years.  At this time, he also began work at the pharmaceutical company Ciba-Geigy.  In 1992, he moved as an executive vice president to Marion Merrell Dow, where he remained as it was acquired and changed names to Hoechst Marion Roussel, and later to Aventis.

In 2005, Douglas left Aventis and took a position as a professor of the practice at Massachusetts Institute of Technology, where he was involved in founding the Center for Biomedical Innovation.  After 2 years at MIT, he resigned over concerns about institutional racism, particularly regarding the tenure-denial of James Sherley.

In 2009, Douglas moved to Akron, Ohio, to serve as president and CEO of the Austen BioInnovation Institute.  He left the institute at the beginning of 2015.

Douglas published an autobiography in 2018, titled Defining Moments of a Free Man from a Black Stream.

Books

Honors and awards
Geoffrey Beene Foundation and GQ Magazine Rock Star of Science, 2010
Black History Makers Award, 2007
 (Medal of the Faculty of Medicine), Goethe University Frankfurt, 2004

References

External links
 

1943 births
Living people
People from Georgetown, Guyana
Lehigh University alumni
Weill Cornell Medical College alumni
Johns Hopkins University alumni
University of Chicago faculty
MIT School of Engineering faculty
MIT Sloan School of Management faculty
American chief executives